Uvs Lake Basin (also Uvs Nuur Basin or Ubs Nuur Basin) is an endorheic basin located on the territorial border of Mongolia and Tuva, a republic of the Russian Federation. The basin is part of the Central Asian Internal Drainage Basin and is named after Uvs Lake (Uvs Nuur, Ubsu Nur), a large saline lake situated in the western part of its drainage basin and is one of the last remnants of the mammoth steppes.

The hollow, and most of the drainage basin, are situated in the Khövsgöl, Zavkhan and Uvs Provinces of north-western Mongolia, and the Mongun-Tayginsky, Ovyursky, Tes-Khemsky and Erzinsky Districts of southern Tuva.

The basin is part of a combination of raised lands and hollows located throughout the Tannu-Ola and Altai mountainous regions. Here, the world's most northern desert meets the Northern Hemisphere's most southern tundra zone. The Mongolian part of the lake and its immediate surroundings were further adopted as Ramsar wetland in 2004.

Geography

The Tannu-Ola mountains form the northern border of Ubsunur Hollow. , the only freshwater lake of the basin, lies, like Uvs Lake, on the Russian-Mongolian border. The more eastern part of the Uvs Lake drainage basin extends, in the north, to the Sengilen ridge of the Sayan Mountains, and in the east, to the basin of Sangiin Dalai Lake. The southern part of the hollow is bordered by the basin of Khyargas Lake, with the Khan Khökhii mountains separating both basins of the Great Lakes Depression. More to the east, the  forms the southern border of Uvs Lake's drainage basin. West of the Uvs Lake Basin lies the endorheic basin of Üüreg Lake, bordered by the Altai Mountains. The  separates, in part, the Uvs and Üüreg lake basins. The south-western tip of the Uvs Lake Basin covers most of the  range, and includes the north-eastern slopes of

Archaeology

According to Greenpeace, Ubsunur Hollow counts 40,000 archaeological sites from nomadic Scythians, Turks, Huns and other tribes. A number of its archaeological artefacts remain unstudied. In Central Asia, it has the highest concentration of burial mounds, constituting around half of its archaeological sites, and many of which are older than the Egyptian pyramids. Thousands of rock carvings and stone sculptures remain from medieval settlements and Buddhist temples.

Archaeological searches carried out in 2007–2008 on the Por-Bazhyn ruins, which are situated on an islet in the Russian part of Tere-Khol' Lake, suggested that the enclosure was built around the middle of the second half of the 8th century, under the Uyghur Khaganate.

Population

The population density is low in the Ubsunur Hollow. Populated almost exclusively by the nomadic Tuvan people, cattle breeders living in yurts, The lack of industry and the reliance of the inhabitants on traditional ways of life, such as nomadic pasturing, have had little impact on the landscape and have allowed the ecosystem to remain relatively free from the negative effects that human presence can impose. Both the Russian
and the Mongolian parts of the hollow are home to nomadic Tuvan cattle herders, who live in yurts and make up virtually all of the population.

Flora and fauna

The Hollow, located on the border between Mongolia and Russia, lies at the intersection of complex ecosystems. The terrain includes glaciers,  desert, alpine tundra,  sub alpine meadows, and  a vast mountain taiga areas. There are also forested steppes, treeless steppes, semi-arid deserts, and ever shifting sand dunes. It is a diversified natural habitat, producing an interaction of Euro-Siberian and Central Asian-Mongolian plant and animal life.

Due to its location on the cusp of the Siberian and Central Asian-Mongolian terrains, the flora and fauna of the hollow exhibit a high biodiversity for mid-latitudes. Animal species that inhabit both mountains and tundra, such as the Siberian roe deer, and Altai snowcock, flourish here. The endangered snow leopard is also present, as well as taiga dwellers such as the Caspian red deer, lynx and wolverine. Steppe dwellers include the Mongolian lark, demoiselle crane and long-tailed Siberian squirrel. Desert inhabitants include the bustard and midday gerbil. The bird species alone number some 359. Since the hollow is a protected area, many ancient species extinct in other regions have found refuge here.

Conservation instruments

In 1993 Russia protected the Tuvan parts of Ubsunur Hollow as the Ubsunurskaya Kotlovina State Nature Biosphere Reserve. In 1995 Greenpeace Russia prepared its proposal to nominate Ubsunur Hollow, in conjunction with Mongolia, as World Heritage Site, describing it as "one of the largest intact watersheds in Central Asia".

Biosphere Reserve
Ubsunur Hollow Biosphere Reserve is a fragile mountain hollow or depression located on the territorial border of Mongolia and  the Republic of Tuva in the Russian Federation among the mountains  — Tannu-Ola Mountains, and the Altay Mountains region —  part of a combination of raised lands and depressions. Here the world's most northern desert meets the world's most southern  tundra zone.

Ubsunur Hollow Reserve (Tuva) was awarded international Biosphere Reserve status in 1998, as a step toward protecting Southern Siberia's wilderness which contain  Russia's largest intact tracts of Siberian Pine and Siberian Fir-dominated ecosystems.

World Heritage site
Ubsunur Hollow was nominated for inclusion  in Russia's second World Heritage Site (the first being the Virgin Komi Forests) in 1995  as "one of the largest intact watersheds in Central Asia where up to 40,000 unexcavated burial mounds and other archaeological sites can be found from historically famous nomadic tribes such as the Scythians, the Turks and the Huns." The nomination was submitted in conjunction with the Tuva Republic and Mongolia and included 75,000 square kilometres of forest and steppe and associated cultural and natural heritage. Other sites included in this first Russian listing proposal were:
 The Virgin Komi Forests  in the Russian Far East (40,000 km2).
 The Volcanoes of Kamchatka (40,000 km2) including unique  forests, salmon streams and volcanoes on the Kamchatka Peninsula).
 The sources of the Ob River in the Altai Mountains (65,000 km2 of mountain ecosystem) of Siberia.
 Vodlozero National Park (including Lake Vygozero) (10,000 km2), Europe's largest intact wetland and old-growth boreal forest (taiga) ecosystem.

The Uvs Lake Basin World Heritage site, designated as 769rev in 2003, includes:
Mongun Taiga, Russia, west of the Uvs Lake drainage basin.
Ubsu-Nur, Russia, area at the north-eastern tip of Uvs Lake.
Oroku-Shinaa, Russia, northern part of the zone around the Tes River, adjacent to part 12 on the Mongolian side.
Aryskannyg, Russia, east of the previous zone, partly in the Tannu-Ola mountains
Jamaalyg, Russia, west of Erzin
Ular, Russia, situated in the western part of the Sengilen ridge
, Mongolia, part of the 
, Mongolia, mountain range south of Üüreg Lake, near Türgen, Uvs.
Uvs Lake, Mongolia, bulk of the Uvs Lake zone
Altan els, Mongolia, sand dune region south of Tere-Khol' Lake, including the Mongolian part of that lake
Tes River, Mongolia, zone between the delta at Uvs Lake and the Russian border

See also
Nomad
Tuvans

References

External links
Ubsu-Nur Accepted into World Network of Biosphere Reserves
Russian Federation Legislative Survey: June 1990-December 1993
Surveying the Lop Nor
 Uvs Nuur Basin at Natural Heritage Protection Fund website

Mongolia–Russia border
Landforms of Tuva
Endorheic basins of Asia
Depressions of Russia
Depressions of Mongolia
Biosphere reserves of Russia
Biosphere reserves of Mongolia
World Heritage Sites in Russia
World Heritage Sites in Mongolia
Zapovednik